Arthur Oswin Austin (December 28, 1879 – June 7, 1964) was an American electrical engineer and inventor.  He is most known as the inventor of the Austin transformer, used to supply power for lighting circuits on radio towers.  He founded Austin Insulator Company and was one of the country's foremost experts in high-voltage insulators.  His research included improvements to radio transmission equipment and the effects of lightning on aircraft.

Personal life 
Austin was born on December 28, 1879, in Stockton, California, to Oswin and Mary Hamman Austin.  In 1903, he graduated from Leland Stanford University with a bachelor's degree in electrical engineering.

In 1907, Austin married Eleanor Briggs from Rochester, New York.  The couple were in an accident in 1919 in which Eleanor was killed and Arthur injured.  In July 1921, Arthur married Augusta Briggs, Eleanor's younger sister.  They had two daughters.

By the 1920s, Austin was a wealthy man.  He purchased the estate of O. C. Barber in Barberton, Ohio.  Austin died on June 7, 1964, in Barberton after a long illness.  After his death, his heirs were unable to maintain the estate and tore down most of the buildings.  Parts of the estate have been placed on the National Register of Historic Places and preserved as the Anna–Dean Farm.

Career 

After graduation, Austin worked for General Electric in Schenectady, New York, for less than a year.  He returned to California where he worked as an insulator inspector for Pacific Gas and Electric.  In 1906, he moved to Lima, New York, to work for the Lima Insulator Company.  The company's factory was destroyed by fire in 1908, after which Austin moved to Ohio to work for Akron Hi-Potential Porcelain Company.  Akron Porcelain became a subsidiary of the Ohio Brass Company which was purchased by Hubbell in 1978.

Over the course of his career, Austin was issued 225 patents, the first in January 1910.  He was considered one of the country's foremost experts in high-voltage insulators and fittings and was a fellow of both the American Institute of Electrical Engineers and Institute of Radio Engineers.

High-voltage laboratory 
In 1926, Austin built an outdoor electrical testing laboratory on the grounds of the Barber estate. In operation until 1933, this was the second of four high-voltage labs established by Ohio Brass.  It has been described as, "a juxtaposition of Victorian elegance and high-tech equipment".

Equipment included 4 iron core 60 Hz transformers manufactured by Allis-Chalmers, rated at 2.2 kV input, 600 kV output. By over-exciting the transformers, Austin was able to increase the output rating to 750 kV and produced up to 900 kV in tests.  A capacitor and synchronous switch was used to produce a transient overvoltage and a spark across a sphere gap which could be applied to objects being studied.  A 1933 newspaper report noted about the lab:

Austin used the lab to experiment with the effects of lightning on aircraft, both airplanes and models of lighter-than-air airships from the Goodyear Zeppelin Corporation and his research led to methods of protecting aircraft from these strikes.  In 1930 Popular Mechanics described the lab as "the most powerful outdoor high-voltage laboratory in the world."  The magazine noted that aircraft lightning strikes had not previously been a major cause of problems because there were few planes and most would stay on the ground during thunderstorms.  The increasing popularity of air travel, however, would make lightning a greater hazard.

The space available on the Barber estate was outgrown in 1933, and a new lab was built by Ohio Brass adjacent to their factory, accommodating a 3000 kV generator.

Austin Insulator Company 
In 1933, Austin started the A. O. Austin Insulator Company.  After Austin's death in 1964, the company passed through a number of ownership changes, being at various times part of Decca Navigator Company (a division of Decca Records) and Litton Marine.   it is once again an independent company known as Austin Insulators Inc.  The company's main products are high-voltage insulators and transformers mostly used by the radio transmission industry.

Austin transformer 

Austin is most known for the type of transformer that bears his name.  This is an air core double-ring toroidal transformer, used at the bases of radio transmission towers to allow electrical power to be fed to the tower lights without interfering with the radio-frequency feed.  Despite having been issued a large number of patents, there are no known patents on this particular invention.  An oil-filled version is used on higher-power LF and VLF military transmitters.

References

Further reading 
 Engineering and Technology History Wiki 
 Historical records at the Barberton Public Library. 

20th-century American inventors
1879 births
1964 deaths
People from Stockton, California
Engineers from California
Stanford University alumni
Fellow Members of the IEEE